Anita Lipnicka (born 13 June 1975) is a Polish singer and songwriter. Her career as a singer started in Varius Manx, a band with which she achieved a great success. In 1996, she made a decision to pursue a solo career, she left the band and moved to London where she made her first solo album. The album was called "Wszystko się może zdarzyć" (Everything Can Happen) and was a huge success. In 1998 Lipnicka released her second solo album "To, co naprawdę" (What Is Real). In 2000, her third solo album appeared-"Moje oczy sa zielone" (My eyes are green). In 2001, Lipnicka started to work with John Porter. Together they recorded two albums, "Nieprzyzwoite piosenki" (Indecent Songs) in 2003 and "Inside Story" in 2005. Both albums were all in English. The album Indecent Songs won The Fryderyk award for The Pop Album of the Year.
In 2006 they released a mini-disc called "Other Stories" and a collection of all their records plus a DVD with their videos called "All The Stories".

She was born in Piotrków Trybunalski.

In February 2008, the duet released their third studio album "Goodbye" which is said to be their last album recorded together. Although they remain a couple in their private life, they decided to focus on their solo careers. Later in 2008 the American singer and songwriter Chris Eckman released his CD "The Last Side of the Mountain", duetting with Anita Lipnicka on the number "Who Will Light Your Path". As all other songs on the CD it is an adaptation of a poem by the Slovenian poet Dane Zajc.

Lipnicka and Porter have one daughter, Pola (born 24 February 2006). Anita Lipnicka is a sister of Arkadiusz Lipnicki, a member of Polish theater team 'Rafał Kmita Group'.

On 13 November Lipnicka released her solo album "Hard Land of Wonder". The first single from the album was "Car Door". The album became Gold.

Discography

Solo albums

Collaborative albums

References

External links
Official Site in Polish
 

1975 births
Living people
Polish musicians
People from Piotrków Trybunalski
Mystic Production artists
Polish pop singers
Polish rock singers
English-language singers from Poland
21st-century Polish singers
21st-century Polish women singers